The Last Days of the Space Age is an upcoming Australian television drama series for Disney+. Principal photography began in July 2022.

Synopsis
The series will focus on three families in Perth, Western Australia in 1979 as an American space station crash landed on earth just outside the city, as the city was gearing up to host the Miss Universe pageant.

Cast
Jesse Spencer
Radha Mitchell
Deborah Mailman
Linh-Dan Pham
Iain Glen
George Mason
Vico Thai
Ines English
Jacek Koman
Mackenzie Mazur
Emily Grant
Thomas Weatherall
Aidan Du Chiem
Luca Timpano Bilbatua
Sam Delich

Production
Filming locations include Perth, Western Australia and Sydney and Wollongong, New South Wales. Christine Pham is the series producer with Princess Pictures’ Laura Waters and Emma Fitzsimons are executive producing alongside writer and creator David Chidlow, and director Bharat Nalluri, as well as Chris Loveall, Stephanie Swedlove, Anna Dokoza.

References

Television shows filmed in Australia
Television shows set in Perth, Western Australia
Television series by Disney